Harbor Beacon Park & Ride is a park and ride lot located in San Pedro, California, served by the Metro J Line, a bus rapid transit route. The parking lot has 180 spaces and is located at the end of Interstate 110 (Harbor Freeway).

The lot was built as part of the project to widen the Harbor Freeway and build the Harbor Transitway. Metro originally intended for Harbor Beacon Park & Ride to be a transit center for San Pedro, but today it is only directly served by one bus route.

Prior to the Metro J Line's extension to San Pedro on December 15, 2015, bus service from San Pedro to downtown Los Angeles was provided by Metro Express Line 450. Metro's NextGen bus study aims to revert the J Line's 950 route back to Metro Express 450.

The stop is close to the north end of the San Pedro Promenade along the waterfront and is walking distance from the Catalina Express terminal and World Cruise Center.

Service

Station layout 
The station has two curbside street stops located along North Beacon Street, alongside the Harbor Beacon Park & Ride lot.

Hours and frequency

Notable places nearby 
The station is within walking distance of the following notable places:
 Catalina Express San Pedro Terminal
 World Cruise Center

References 

J Line (Los Angeles Metro)
Los Angeles Metro Busway stations
Bus stations in Los Angeles